Jinan Foreign Language School (JFLS, or  JNFLS) is a foreign language school located in Jinan, China, and is divided into three branches/levels: the junior, senior, and primary branches. The school is the only one of its kind officially registered with the State Education Ministry of Shandong Province. It is also the school which sends the largest number of admitted-by-recommendation students toward Chinese priority colleges and universities among all Chinese high schools. In a 2016 ranking of Chinese high schools that send students to study in American universities, Jinan Foreign Language School ranked number 42 in mainland China in terms of the number of students entering top American universities.

Branches

Primary Branch

Kaiyuan International School

A full-time, privately run boarding school, Jinan Foreign Language School Kaiyuan International School() opened in 2000 after the Jinan Foreign Language School and Jinan Huanshan Real Estate Development Co., Ltd. signed an agreement in December 1999 to operate a school.

Jinan Foreign Language School also operates several co-operation programs with Jinan Waihai Progressive School, Jinan Sunshine 100 School and Jinan Quanxin Primary School.

Jinan Waihai Progressive School

Jinan Waihai Progressive School() is a full-time, privately run boarding school. In November 2004, Jinan Foreign Language signed a school management agreement with Jinan Waihai Real Estate Development Co., Ltd. The school was then entrusted with the responsibility of administrating Jinan Waihai Progressive School. It is currently located at 19 Xingfu Street, Huaiyin District.

Junior Branch
The Junior Branch, located at No. 23 Shifan Road, is the branch of Middle School.

Senior Branch (HuaShan)
The Jinan Foreign Language School HuaShan Branch, also referred to as the HuaShan Branch, is a private secondary school established in March 1996. The HuaShan Branch is a recently established school and is directed by Jinan Foreign Language School. It is currently located at Jinyu Avenue in the HuaShan Town, Licheng District.

International cooperation

The school has international cooperation with the following educational institutions:

 Academy of Kansai Language School, Fushimi, Kyoto, Japan
 Lycée et Collège Emile Zola de Rennes, Rennes, France
 Parkview Elementary Junior High School, Edmonton, Alberta, Canada
 Windsor Locks High School Windsor Locks, Connecticut, US
 No. 67 High School, Nizhny Novgorod, Russia
 De La Salle High School, LaSalle, Quebec, Canada
 Helsinge Upper Secondary School, Vantaa, Finland
 Adelaide High School, Adelaide, South Australia, Australia
 Saint-Petersburg State University of Service and Economics, Saint Petersburg
 Moscow State Institute of Radio Engineering, Electronics and Automation, Moscow
 Hangzhou Foreign Language School: http://www.chinahw.net/html_en/template/aboutus.html

References

External links
Official Site of Jinan Foreign Language School & Sanjian Branch 济南外国语学校（三箭分校） 
Official Site of Kaiyuan International School 济南外国语学校开元国际分校 
Official Site of Jinan Waihai Progressive School 济南外海实验学校 

Schools in Shandong
Foreign-language high schools in China
Schools in China